Portage Township may refer to:

Indiana
 Portage Township, Porter County, Indiana
 Portage Township, St. Joseph County, Indiana

Michigan
 Portage Charter Township, Michigan, in Houghton County
 Portage Township, Kalamazoo County, Michigan, now the city of Portage
 Portage Township, Mackinac County, Michigan

Minnesota
 Portage Township, St. Louis County, Minnesota

Missouri
 Portage Township, New Madrid County, Missouri

Ohio
 Portage Township, Hancock County, Ohio
 Portage Township, Ottawa County, Ohio
 Portage Township, Summit County, Ohio, defunct
 Portage Township, Wood County, Ohio

Pennsylvania
 Portage Township, Cambria County, Pennsylvania
 Portage Township, Cameron County, Pennsylvania
 Portage Township, Potter County, Pennsylvania

South Dakota
 Portage Township, Brown County, South Dakota, in Brown County, South Dakota

Township name disambiguation pages